Boyd's Coffee Company, or Boyd Coffee Company, is a coffee company founded in 1900. In 2016, the company was sold to Farmer Brothers, based in Texas. In 2018, Boyd's announced plans to lay off 230 employees, and close operations in Eugene and Portland, Oregon, its home.

See also
 List of coffee companies

References

1900 establishments in Oregon
2018 disestablishments in Oregon
Coffee companies of the United States
Food and drink companies based in Portland, Oregon
Food and drink companies established in 1900
Food and drink companies disestablished in 2018